Bitter Sweet is the fourth studio album by The Main Ingredient. Released in 1972 this is the first album to feature lead singer Cuba Gooding, Sr. Includes the top five pop and soul hit single "Everybody Plays the Fool".  The song was nominated for a Grammy Award in the category Best R&B Song at the 1973 ceremony.

Track listing

Personnel
Bert De Coteaux - arranger, conductor
Buzz Willis - production supervisor
Acy Lehman - art direction
Nick Sangiamo - photography

Charts

Singles

References

External links
 

1972 albums
The Main Ingredient (band) albums
RCA Records albums